The Prairie League was an independent league of baseball which was based in the prairie provinces of Saskatchewan and Manitoba and the states of North Dakota, South Dakota, Minnesota and Wisconsin. The league was original in its naming by  choosing not to resurrect a name previously used by a defunct minor league. The professional eight-team league was founded in 1995 following the demise of the North Central League. Having produced several major league prospects, it ceased operations after the 1997 season due to financial troubles and lack of interest in cities.

Cities Represented
 Aberdeen, SD: Aberdeen Pheasants 1995–1997
 Austin, MN: Southern Minny Stars 1996–1997
 Bismarck, ND: Dakota Rattlers 1995–1996
 Brainerd, MN: Brainerd Bobcats 1997
 Brandon, MB: Brandon Grey Owls 1995–1996; West Manitoba Wranglers 1997
 Grand Forks, ND: Grand Forks Varmints 1996–1997
 Green Bay, WI: Green Bay Sultans 1996
 Minneapolis, MN: Minneapolis Loons 1995
 Minot, ND: Minot Mallards 1995–1997
 Moose Jaw, SK: Moose Jaw Diamond Dogs 1995–1997
 Regina, SK: Regina Cyclones 1995–1997
 Saskatoon, SK: Saskatoon Riot 1995; Saskatoon Smokin' Guns 1996; Saskatoon Stallions 1997

Notable League Alumni
 Chris Coste
 Kerry Ligtenberg
 Shawn Wooten
 Curt Ford

Sports leagues established in 1995
Defunct professional sports leagues in the United States
Defunct independent baseball leagues in the United States
Organizations disestablished in 1997
Defunct baseball leagues in Canada
Defunct minor baseball leagues in the United States